The Piedmont is a plateau region located in the Eastern United States. It is situated between the Atlantic Plain and the main Appalachian Mountains, stretching from New York in the north to central Alabama in the south. The Piedmont Province is a physiographic province of the larger Appalachian division which consists of the Gettysburg-Newark Lowlands, the Piedmont Upland, and the Piedmont Lowlands sections.

The Atlantic Seaboard Fall Line marks the Piedmont's eastern boundary with the Coastal Plain. To the west, it is mostly bounded by the Blue Ridge Mountains, the easternmost range of the main Appalachians. The width of the Piedmont varies, being quite narrow above the Delaware River but nearly 300 miles (475 km) wide in North Carolina.

Geology
The surface relief of the Piedmont is characterized by relatively low, rolling hills with heights above sea level between 200 feet (50 m) and 800 feet to 1,000 feet (250 m to 300 m). Its geology is complex, with numerous rock formations of different materials and ages intermingled with one another. Essentially, the Piedmont is the remnant of several ancient mountain chains that have since been eroded. Geologists have identified at least five separate events which have led to sediment deposition, including the Grenville orogeny (the collision of continents that created the supercontinent Rodinia) and the Appalachian orogeny during the formation of Pangaea. The last major event in the history of the Piedmont was the break-up of Pangaea, when North America and Africa began to separate. Large basins formed from the rifting and were subsequently filled by the sediments shed from the surrounding higher ground. The series of Mesozoic basins is almost entirely located inside the Piedmont region.

Soils and farming
Piedmont soils are generally clay-like (Ultisols) and moderately fertile. In some areas they have suffered from erosion and over-cropping, particularly in the South where cotton was historically the chief crop. In the central Piedmont region of North Carolina and Virginia, tobacco is the main crop, while in the north region there is more diversity, including orchards, dairying, and general farming.

Music
The portion of the Piedmont region in the southern United States is closely associated with the Piedmont blues, a style of blues music that originated there in the late 19th century. According to the Piedmont Blues Preservation Society, most Piedmont blues musicians came from Virginia, North and South Carolina, and Georgia. During the Great Migration, African Americans migrated to the Piedmont. With the Appalachian Mountains to the west, those who might otherwise have spread into rural areas  stayed in cities and were thus exposed to a broader mixture of music than those in, for example, the rural Mississippi delta. Thus, Piedmont blues was influenced by many types of music such as ragtime, country, and popular songs — styles that had comparatively less influence on blues music in other regions.

Cities

Many major cities are located on the Atlantic Seaboard fall line, the eastern boundary of the Piedmont. (In Georgia and Alabama, where the Piedmont runs mostly east to west, the fall line is its southern boundary.) The fall line, where the land rises abruptly from the coastal plain, marks the limit of navigability on many major rivers, so inland ports sprang up along it.

Within the Piedmont region itself, there are several areas of urban concentration, the largest being the Philadelphia metropolitan area in Pennsylvania and New Jersey. The Piedmont cuts Maryland in half, covering the Baltimore–Washington metropolitan area. In Virginia, the Greater Richmond metropolitan area is the largest urban concentration. In North Carolina, the Piedmont Crescent includes several metropolitan clusters such as Charlotte metropolitan area, the Piedmont Triad, and the Research Triangle. Other notable areas include the Greenville-Spartanburg-Anderson, SC Combined Statistical Area in South Carolina, and the Atlanta metropolitan area in Georgia.

See also 
 Cecil (soil)
 Piedmont Atlantic
 Piedmont region of Virginia
 Interstate 85

References

Further reading

External links 

 Hilton Pond Center for Piedmont Natural History
 

Regions of the United States
Regions of North Carolina
Regions of South Carolina
Regions of Virginia
Geology of Alabama
Geology of New Jersey
Geology of Pennsylvania
Geology of Delaware
Geology of Georgia (U.S. state)
Geology of Maryland
Geology of Virginia
Geology of North Carolina
Geology of South Carolina
Geology of Washington, D.C.
Physiographic provinces